Liu Siqi (2 March 1930 – 7 January 2022), also known as Liu Songlin, was the wife of Mao Anying, the first son of Mao Zedong.

Biography 

Her name "Siqi" means "missing Shandong". She had two half sisters, Shao Hua and Zhang Shaolin. In 1938, she was accepted as a goddaughter by Mao Zedong in Yan'an, Shaanxi. In 1939, Liu went to the Soviet Union with her family. When they passed Xinjiang, they were detained by warlord Sheng Shicai and spent eight years in prison. In 1946, under the mediation of Zhou Enlai, she returned to Yan'an, where she met Mao Anying, the first son of Mao Zedong. In May 1948, they became lovers in Xibaipo and got married at Zhongnanhai, in Beijing, on 15 October 1949. In November 1950, Mao Anying died in an air raid by the U.S.-ROK coalition forces in the Korean War. In 1955, she pursued advanced studies at Moscow State University. In 1957, she returned to China and studied Russian language and literature at Peking University. In early 1962, she remarried to Yang Maozhi, a faculty member of the PLA Air Force Academy (now ). They had two sons and two daughters. On 7 January 2022, she died in Beijing, aged 91.

References 

1930 births
2022 deaths
People from Hubei
Moscow State University alumni
Peking University alumni
Mao Zedong family